I-69 is a sports club from Greenland based in Ilulissat. They competed in football and handball.

Achievements 
Greenlandic Women's Football Championship: 7
Champion: 1995, 1996, 1997, 1998, 1999, 2000, 2003
Second: 2002
Third: 1988

Greenlandic Men's Handball Championship: 5
Champion: 1985, 1987, 1988, 1989, 1990

Greenlandic Women's Handball Championship: 2
Champion: 1982, 1989

References 

Football clubs in Greenland
Handball clubs in Greenland
Association football clubs established in 1969
Handball clubs established in 1969
1969 establishments in Greenland